Hélio Altino Fonseca Lopes da Cruz (born 8 August 1993 in Lisbon) is a Portuguese footballer who plays for Amora as a midfielder.

Football career
On 2 August 2015, Cruz made his professional debut with Atlético in a 2015–16 Taça da Liga match against Santa Clara.

He is of Cape Verdean descent.

References

External links
Stats and profile at LPFP 

1993 births
Living people
Portuguese people of Cape Verdean descent
Footballers from Lisbon
Portuguese footballers
Association football midfielders
Liga Portugal 2 players
G.D. Joane players
Moreirense F.C. players
G.D. Ribeirão players
Atlético Clube de Portugal players
F.C. Penafiel players
C.D. Mafra players
Amora F.C. players